Bayazitovo (Bayazit) is a rural locality (a village) in Tashlinsky Selsoviet, Alsheyevsky District, Bashkortostan, Russia. The population was 81 as of 2010. There are 2 streets.

Geography 
Bayazitovo is located 23 km northwest of Rayevsky (the district's administrative centre) by road. Tashtyube is the nearest rural locality.

References 

Rural localities in Alsheyevsky District